Kiyoko Fukuda (born 4 August 1970) is a Japanese former volleyball player who competed in the 1992 Summer Olympics.

References

1970 births
Living people
Japanese women's volleyball players
Olympic volleyball players of Japan
Volleyball players at the 1992 Summer Olympics
Asian Games medalists in volleyball
Volleyball players at the 1990 Asian Games
Volleyball players at the 1994 Asian Games
Medalists at the 1990 Asian Games
Medalists at the 1994 Asian Games
Asian Games bronze medalists for Japan
Goodwill Games medalists in volleyball
Competitors at the 1994 Goodwill Games
20th-century Japanese women
21st-century Japanese women